Roasting is a process of heating a sulfide ore to a high temperature in the presence of air. It is a step in the processing of certain ores.  More specifically, roasting is often a metallurgical process involving gas–solid reactions at elevated temperatures with the goal of purifying the metal component(s).  Often before roasting, the ore has already been partially purified, e.g. by froth flotation.  The concentrate is mixed with other materials to facilitate the process.  The technology is useful in making certain ores usable but it can also be a serious source of air pollution.

Roasting consists of thermal gas–solid reactions, which can include oxidation, reduction, chlorination, sulfation, and pyrohydrolysis.  In roasting, the ore or ore concentrate is treated with very hot air.  This process is generally applied to sulfide minerals.  During roasting, the sulfide is converted to an oxide, and sulfur is released as sulfur dioxide, a gas.  For the ores Cu2S (chalcocite) and ZnS (sphalerite), balanced equations for the roasting are:
2 Cu2S + 3 O2 → 2 Cu2O  +  2 SO2
2 ZnS  + 3 O2   →   2 ZnO + 2 SO2

The gaseous product of sulfide roasting, sulfur dioxide (SO2) is often used to produce sulfuric acid.  Many sulfide minerals contain other components such as arsenic that are released into the environment.

Up until the early 20th century, roasting was started by burning wood on top of ore.  This would raise the temperature of the ore to the point where its sulfur content would become its source of fuel, and the roasting process could continue without external fuel sources.  Early sulfide roasting was practiced in this manner in "open hearth" roasters, which were manually stirred (a practice called "rabbling") using rake-like tools to expose unroasted ore to oxygen as the reaction proceeded.

This process released large amounts of acidic, metallic, and other toxic compounds. Results of this include areas that even after 60–80 years are still largely lifeless, often exactly corresponding to the area of the roast bed, some of which are hundreds of metres wide by kilometres long. Roasting is an exothermic process.

Roasting operations

The following describe different forms of roasting:

Oxidizing roasting 
Oxidizing roasting, the most commonly practiced roasting process, involves heating the ore in excess of air or oxygen, to burn out or replace the impurity element, generally sulfur, partly or completely by oxygen. For sulfide roasting, the general reaction can be given by:
2MS (s) +  3O2 (g) ->  2MO (s)  +  2SO2 (g)
Roasting the sulfide ore, until almost complete removal of the sulfur from the ore, results in a dead roast.

Volatilizing roasting 
Volatilizing roasting, involves oxidation at elevated temperatures of the ores, to eliminate impurity elements in the form of their volatile oxides. Examples of such volatile oxides include As2O3, Sb2O3, ZnO and sulfur oxides. Careful control of the oxygen content in the roaster is necessary, as excessive oxidation can form non-volatile oxides.

Chloridizing roasting 
Chloridizing roasting transforms certain metal compounds to chlorides through oxidation or reduction. Some metals such as uranium, titanium, beryllium and some rare earths are processed in their chloride form. Certain forms of chloridizing roasting may be represented by the overall reactions:
2NaCl  +  MS  +  2O2   ->    Na2SO4  +  MCl,
4NaCl  +  2MO  +  S2  +  3O2    ->  2Na2SO4  +  2MCl2
The first reaction represents the chlorination of a sulfide ore involving an exothermic reaction. The second reaction involving an oxide ore is facilitated by addition of elemental sulfur. Carbonate ores react in  a similar manner as the oxide ore, after decomposing to their oxide form at high temperatures.

Sulfating roasting 
Sulfating roasting oxidizes certain sulfide ores to sulfates in a supply of air to enable leaching of the sulfate for further processing.

Magnetic roasting 
Magnetic roasting involves controlled roasting of the ore to convert it into a magnetic form, thus enabling easy separation and processing in subsequent steps. For example, controlled reduction of haematite (non magnetic Fe2O3) to magnetite (magnetic Fe3O4).

Reduction roasting 
Reduction roasting partially reduces an oxide ore before the actual smelting process.

Sinter roasting 
Sinter roasting involves heating the fine ores at high temperatures, where simultaneous oxidation and agglomeration of the ores take place. For example, lead sulfide ores are subjected to sinter roasting in a continuous process after froth flotation to convert the fine ores to workable agglomerates for further smelting operations.

References

Metallurgy
Metallurgical processes